Katz syndrome is a rare congenital disorder, presenting as a polymalformative syndrome characterized by enlarged viscera, hepatomegaly, diabetes, and skeletal anomalies that result in a short stature, cranial hyperostosis, and typical facial features. It is probably a variant of the autosomal recessive type of  Craniometaphyseal Dysplasia.

Symptoms and signs
Manifestations include enlarged viscera, hepatomegaly, diabetes, short stature and cranial hyperostosis.

Diagnosis

Treatment

References

Congenital disorders
Syndromes affecting the hepatobiliary system
Syndromes with craniofacial abnormalities
Rare genetic syndromes
Syndromes with short stature
Rare syndromes